Stumble is the second album by the AALY Trio + Ken Vandermark, which was recorded live at Chicago's Unity Temple in 1998 and released on Wobbly Rail, a short-lived imprint started by Merge Records/Superchunk principal Mac McCaughan. AALY Trio is a Swedish free jazz band led by saxophonist Mats Gustafsson. Originally just a guest, Vandermark became a full member of the group.

Reception

In her review for AllMusic, Joslyn Layne states "These numbers are firmly entrenched in blues roots, carrying on a wailing, at times plaintive, blues spirit with conviction." 

The Penguin Guide to Jazz notes that "Vandermark and Gustafsson are formidably like-minded, at least in the way they want the band to make its impression, and the sound of the quartet in full flight has a harsh, narcotic edge to it."

The JazzTimes review by Bill Shoemaker states "While there is plenty of wide-open blowing space for the two saxophonists (Vandermark also plays a good amount of pungent clarinets), and the flexible, fluent Janson and Nordeson, there is an overarching ensemble cohesion that holds this album together."

Track listing
 "Stumble" (Ken Vandermark) – 11:52
 "Umeå" (Peter Janson) – 11:28
 "Hommage à Lillen" (Mats Gustafsson / Kjell Nordeson) – 6:24
 "Song For Che" (Charlie Haden) – 14:29
 "Why I Don't Go Back" (Ken Vandermark) – 13:40

Personnel
Mats Gustafsson - tenor sax, fluteophone, flute
 Peter Janson - bass
 Kjell Nordeson - drums
Ken Vandermark - tenor sax, clarinet, bass clarinet

References

1998 live albums
Mats Gustafsson live albums
Ken Vandermark live albums